1 Arietis is a double star in the northern constellation of Aries. 1 Arietis is the Flamsteed designation. The pair have a combined visual magnitude of 5.86, making it faintly visible to the naked eye. As of 2016, the secondary had an angular separation of  along a position angle of 165° from the primary. They are moving further from the Earth with a heliocentric radial velocity of +7 km/s.

The brighter star, designated component A, is a magnitude 6.40 giant star with a stellar classification of K1 III. The companion star, component B, is a magnitude 7.20 A-type main sequence star with a classification of A6 V. Helmut Abt (1985) had this star classified as A3 IV, matching a more evolved subgiant.

References

External links
 CCDM J01501+2217A
 Image 1 Arietis

K-type giants
A-type main-sequence stars
Binary stars
Aries (constellation)
Durchmusterung objects
Arietis, 01
011154
008544
0530